Square script may refer to any of several scripts with blocky letters: 

for Hebrew,
 the modern Hebrew alphabet (as opposed to the old Paleo-Hebrew and the later Samaritan script)

for Mongolian,
 'Phags-pa script
 Zanabazar square script